Forsyth County News is a subscription-based local newspaper covering news in Forsyth County in Georgia. It is published twice a week on Wednesday and Sunday, with a weekend e-edition available on Fridays and is entirely owned by Metro Market Media.  The Gainesville Times and Dawson County News also became part of Metro Market Media in the same transaction. Stephanie Woody is the Publisher. The Forsyth County News serves a population of 227,967. Its current circulation is 14,500. The website portion of the local newspaper averages well over 100,000 hits per month.

History 
Joe Patterson founded Forsyth County News in 1908 in downtown Cumming, Georgia. Joe Patterson sold the newspaper to Roy P. Otwell, who then combined the North Georgian and Forsyth County News into one newspaper. In 1954, Charles Smithgall Sr. bought the newspaper and eventually sold it to News Corp in the 1970s. News Corp had been publishing Gwinnett Daily News, Forsyth County News, and Winder News. Robert Fowler sold News Corp to The New York Times for 103 million dollars in 1987. By 1994, Swartz-Morris Media acquired Forsyth County News and the Forsyth Forum Newspaper, the county legal organ, and merged them into the new Forsyth County News. During 2018, the newspaper was purchased by Metro Market Media in a family transaction.

Coverage 
Forsyth County News is based out of Forsyth County, Georgia and delivers news content to that local area.

 Local News Coverage
 Education
 Crime & Courts
 Local Government
 Business
 Community
 Community Calendar
Weather
 Sports Coverage
Forsyth Central High School
 Lambert High School
 North Forsyth High School
 West Forsyth High School
 South Forsyth High School
 Pinecrest Academy
 Horizon Christian Academy
 Denmark High School
 Obituaries
The Best of Forsyth contest is owned and managed by the Forsyth County News.

Awards 

2016
Southern Newspaper Publisher Association (SNPA) - Mega-Innovation Award
2017
 First Place
Associated Press - Best Feature Photo & Photo of the Year by Micah Green
Associated Press - Best Website
Associated Press - Best Multiplatform Coverage of a Single Story: Racing with Purpose: A Day with the North Georgia Quarter Midget Association by Paul Dybas and Micah Green
Associated Press - Best Photo Illustration: Evan – The Grind  by Micah Green
Associated Press - Best Picture Story: The ABeeCs of beekeeping (and how it can save the world) by Micah Green
Associated Press - Best Sports Writing: Football: Former West Forsyth standout Guthrie turns JUCO journey into D-I future by Michael Foster
 Second Place
Associated Press - Public Service: The Business of Buying our Children: Child Sex Trafficking North of the Atlanta Perimeter by Kayla Robins, Paul Dybas and Micah Green
Associated Press - Portfolio by Micah Green
Associated Press - Multiplatform Coverage of a Single Story: Massage Parlors Raided, Cited for Ordinance Violations by Kayla Robins and Paul Dybas
Associated Press - Spot News Photo: Preparing for the Heat by Jim Dean
 Third Place
Associated Press - Multiplatform Coverage of a Single Story: Hopewell Roofing Gives Back to Forsyth County Senior in Need bu Paul Dybas, Micah Green and Kayla Robins
Associated Press - Feature Writing: Medal Tested: Paralympian Returns to Cumming After Winning Big in Rio by Kayla Robins
Associated Press - Spot News Photo: An Accident’s Aftermath by Jim Dean
Associated Press - Non-Deadline Reporting: Suicide: Lost in the Shadows by Isabel Hughes
Associated Press - Beat Reporting: Local Government by Kelly Whitmire
Associated Press - Photo Illustration: Denver Stonecheck by Micah Green
Associated Press - Sports Writing: Four Middle School Girls are Kicking Stereotypes by Michael Foster

References

External links

Newspapers published in Georgia (U.S. state)
Forsyth County, Georgia